Villarica is a genus of moths belonging to the family Tortricidae. It contains only one species, Villarica villaricae, which is found in the Araucanía Region of Chile.

The wingspan is about 15 mm. The ground colour of the forewings is preserved in the form of a white dorsal blotch followed towards the costa by brownish cream interfascia. The apical area is cream, somewhat mixed with brownish olive. The tornal area is whitish. The markings are olive brown with brown suffusions and spots. The hindwings are pale brown.

Etymology
The generic name refers to the name of type locality of the type-species and the species name is also based on the name of type locality.

References

Euliini
Moths described in 2010
Taxa named by Józef Razowski
Moths of South America
Endemic fauna of Chile